The guaraní (plural: guaraníes; sign: ₲; code: PYG) is the national currency unit of Paraguay. The guaraní was divided into 100 céntimos but, because of inflation, céntimos are no longer in use.

History 
The law creating the guaraní was passed on 5 October 1943, and replaced the peso fuerte at a rate of ₲1 = 100 pesos fuertes. Guaraníes were first issued in 1944. Between 1960 and 1985, the guaraní was pegged to the United States dollar at ₲126 = US$1.

Coins 
In 1944, aluminum-bronze coins were introduced in denominations of 1¢, 5¢, 10¢, 25¢ and 50¢. All were round shaped. The obverses featured a flower with "Republica del Paraguay" and the date surrounding it, except for the 50¢, which featured the lion and Liberty cap insignia. The denomination was shown on the reverses.

First series:

The second issue, introduced in 1953, consisted of 10¢, 15¢, 25¢ and 50¢ coins. All were again minted in aluminium-bronze but were scallop shaped and featured the lion and Liberty cap on the obverse. None of the céntimo coins circulate today.

In 1975, coins were introduced in denominations of ₲1, ₲5, ₲10 and ₲50, all of which were round and made of stainless steel. Since 1990, stainless steel has been replaced by brass-plated steel  nickel-brass. ₲100 coins were introduced in 1990, followed by ₲500 in 1997. ₲1,000 coins were minted in 2006 and released in 2007.

Coins in denominations of ₲1, ₲5 and ₲10 and coins of ₲50, ₲100 and ₲500 guaranies minted until 2005 were demonetized.

Banknotes 
The first guaraní notes were of 50¢, ₲1, ₲5, and ₲10 overstamped on $P50, $P100, $P500, and $P1,000 in 1943. Regular guaraní notes for ₲1, ₲5, ₲10, ₲50, ₲100, ₲500 and ₲1,000, soon followed. They were printed by De La Rue.

The 1963 series (under the law of 1952) was a complete redesign. The lineup also expanded upward with the addition of ₲5,000 and ₲10,000. The 1982 revision added denominations in the Guaraní language to the reverses.

The first ₲50,000 notes were issued in 1990, followed by ₲100,000 in 1998.

Starting from 2004, the existing denominations, except ₲50,000, underwent small but easily noticeable changes, such as a more sophisticated and borderless underprint and enhanced security features. Giesecke & Devrient print the new ₲20,000 note, while De La Rue prints the rest. In 2009, the Central Bank launched the first ₲2,000 polymer-made notes, which makes the notes more durable than the traditional cotton-fiber notes.

New ₲50,000 notes of series C have been printed with the date of 2005, but as they obviously reached circulation by criminal ways before being launched officially, this series has been declared void and worthless by the central bank and notes of ₲1,000 and series A and B of ₲50,000 were demonetized in 2012.

A new ₲5,000 note has been released. The ₲5,000 was put into circulation on January 14, 2013. This note has been printed by The Canadian Bank Note Company. Such security features include a see through window in the shape of a locomotive, a watermark of the portrait. However this note will still bear the portrait of Don Carlos Antonio Lopez, the reverse will also have the same design of Lopez's Palace.
₲10,000 as well as ₲20,000 notes are produced by Polish Security Printing Works.

On December 22, 2016, new ₲20,000, ₲50,000 and ₲100,000 notes were introduced with upgraded security.

Revaluation
The guaraní is currently one of the least valued currency units in the Americas, US$1 being equivalent as of December, 2022, to ₲7,154.

In 2011, plans were released under which the Paraguayan guaraní would be revalued as the Nuevo guaraní ("New guaraní") (PYN) at the rate of 1,000:1.

From day 1 (currently unknown), there would be a conversion at the rate of ₲1,000 = N₲1 ("nuevo guaraní"). After a two-year transition period (with N₲ as the currency sign), new banknotes with the lower value would be introduced, re-using the name guaraní (₲) for the lower value.

However, due to possible confusion and problems with the projects, it is currently suspended.

See also
 Economy of Paraguay

References

Bibliography

External links

 Paraguayan guaraní banknotes
 Guarani currency exchange rate

Currencies of Paraguay
Currencies introduced in 1944
Currency symbols